The 1884 Colorado gubernatorial election was held on November 4, 1884. Republican nominee Benjamin Harrison Eaton defeated Democratic nominee Alva Adams with 50.74% of the vote.

General election

Candidates
Major party candidates
Benjamin Harrison Eaton, Republican
Alva Adams, Democratic

Other candidates
John E. Washburn, Greenback

Results

References

1884
Colorado
Gubernatorial